Anoplocurius is a genus of beetles in the family Cerambycidae, containing the following species:

 Anoplocurius altus Knull, 1942
 Anoplocurius canotiae Fisher, 1920
 Anoplocurius incompletus Linsley, 1942

References

Elaphidiini